Dastan Kasmamytov or Danik (born ), is a Kyrgyz LGBTIQ rights activist.

Kasmamytov is a member of the steering committees of the Global Forum on MSM & HIV and the Eurasian Coalition on Male Health, a board member of Labrys, a co-founder of Bishkek Feminist Collective SQ, and a coordinator for Kyrgyz Indigo, LGBTIQ Initiative and Youth Initiative.

Kasmamytov studied in Metropolitan University in Oslo (Norway), Free University in Berlin (Germany), American University in Central Asia (Kyrgyzstan), Pierce College (USA).

Kasmamytov came out at a press conference on a Human Rights Watch report on police violence against gay and bisexual people in Kyrgyzstan. He has, as a result of coming out and of his activism, received multiple death threats.

Kasmamytov lives and studies now in Europe.

Kasmamytov cycled from Central Asia to Germany and founded Pink Summits, a campaign to conquer 7 Summits for a sake of LGBT visibility.

See also 
 LGBT rights in Kyrgyzstan

References

Further reading 

  – includes an interview with Kasmamytov.
  – another interview with Kasmamytov.

Kyrgyzstani human rights activists
Living people
Kyrgyzstani LGBT rights activists
1990s births